Peter Brown (born 15 June 1949) is a former Australian rules footballer who played for Geelong in the Victorian Football League (VFL) in 1971.

References

External links

1949 births
Living people
Geelong Football Club players
Epping Football Club players
Australian rules footballers from Victoria (Australia)